Stephen or Steven Emerson may refer to:

Stephen G. Emerson (born 1953), American scientist
Steven Emerson (born 1954), American writer
Stephen Emerson (author) (born 1950), American fiction and prose writer
Steve Emerson (visual effects artist), American special effects supervisor

See also
Emerson (surname)